The following are the national records in Olympic weightlifting in Serbia. Records are maintained in each weight class for the snatch lift, clean and jerk lift, and the total for both lifts by the Serbian Weightlifting Federation (Савез Србије за дизање тегова).

Current records

Men

Women

Historical records

Men (1998–2018)

Women

References
General
Serbian records – Men 
Serbian records – Women 
Specific

External links
Serbian Weightlifting Federation website
Serbian Weightlifting Federation records subpage

Serbia
Records
Olympic weightlifting
weightlifting